Arrhynchus is a genus of small-headed flies in the family Acroceridae. It was formerly considered a synonym of Ocnaea, but was reinstated as a valid genus by Schlinger in 1968. It is endemic to Chile.

Species
 Arrhynchus maculatus Schlinger, 1968
 Arrhynchus meridionalis (Sabrosky, 1946)
 Arrhynchus penai Schlinger, 1968
 Arrhynchus stuardoi (Sabrosky, 1946)
 Arrhynchus vittatus Philippi, 1871

References

Acroceridae
Diptera of South America
Arthropods of Chile
Taxa named by Rodolfo Amando Philippi
Endemic fauna of Chile